is a professional Japanese baseball player. He is an outfielder for the Hokkaido Nippon-Ham Fighters of Nippon Professional Baseball (NPB).

References 

1997 births
Living people
Nippon Professional Baseball outfielders
Baseball people from Hokkaido
Hokkaido Nippon-Ham Fighters players
Sportspeople from Sapporo